

W

Notes
  WAS is common IATA code for Washington Dulles International Airport , Baltimore–Washington International Airport  and Ronald Reagan Washington National Airport .

References

Footnotes

Sources
  - includes IATA codes
 
 Aviation Safety Network - IATA and ICAO airport codes
 Great Circle Mapper - IATA, ICAO and FAA airport codes

W